Blera ochrozona   is a species of hoverfly in the family Syrphidae.

Distribution
Russia.

References

Diptera of Asia
Eristalinae
Insects described in 1928
Taxa named by Aleksandr Stackelberg